Peaceful Death and Pretty Flowers is the second album by the Houston, Texas based death/thrash metal band Dead Horse. It was released in 1991 on the independent label Big Chief Records, and again eight years later on Relapse Records, with four bonus tracks. Peaceful Death and Pretty Flowers was Dead Horse's last studio album for 26 years (until 2017's The Beast That Comes), although the band had released three EPs of new material in the interim.

Reception

Alex Henderson of AllMusic states that Peaceful Death and Pretty Flowers is "worth searching for if you're a headbanger."

Track listing

Personnel
 Michael Haaga – vocals, guitars
 Greg Martin – guitars, backing vocals
 Allen (Alpo) Price – bass, backing vocals
 Ronnie Guyote – drums, backing vocals

References

1991 albums
Dead Horse (band) albums